XHKV-FM 88.5/XEKV-AM 740 is a combo radio station in Villahermosa, Tabasco. It carries the Exa FM national format from MVS Radio. XEKV and XHKV are broadcast from a transmitter facility in Col. Las Gaviotas, on Villahermosa's east side.

History
The concession for 740 AM was awarded in March 1971 to Enrique Lodoza Gómez. In 1994, the FM station was added.

In 2012, XEKV/XHKV was sold to Radio Dinámica del Sureste, which is primarily owned by México Radio, S.A. de C.V., the radio subsidiary of Organización Editorial Mexicana.

References

Radio stations in Tabasco
Radio stations established in 1971
Villahermosa